Devonshire Colts FC is a football club based in Devonshire Parish, Bermuda and are in the Cingular Wireless Premier Division league. 

The team colours are orange and white.

History
The Devonshire Colts Football Club was established in 1958, due to the efforts of Mr. Edward DeJean and Mr. Braxton Burgess. These men were members of the Howard Academy, aka Skinners School, in Bermuda. DeJean was the principal while Burgess was a physical education teacher.

Following their school level successes, the Howard Academy team moved on to participating in practice matches with local men's football teams which subsequently led to the application and entry into the Bermuda Football Union.

The Devonshire Colts play on Police Field, where formerly police dogs were exercised.

Colts were relegated to the Bermuda First Division in 2011, they returned to the Bermudian Premier Division after 4 years in for the 2015/16 season after beating St David's in March 2015.

Colts were once again relegated to the Bermuda First Division in 2017, but this time with the fewest points(4) total in the history of the Bermuda Premier Division

Rivalries
Devonshire Colts main rivalries are Devonshire Cougars and St. Georges Colts. Devonshire Colts fans consider B.A.A as a distant rivalry as they are not located close to each other. Additionally, a strong rivalry with Devonshire Cougars dates back to when both clubs were founded with "Devonshire' in their name. More recently a rivalry with B.A.A has grown following repeated clashes in competitions.

Achievements/Failures
Cingular Wireless Premier Division: 3
 1971/72, 1972/73, 1996/97

Bermuda FA Cup: 5
 1972/73, 1973/74, 1998/99, 2000/01, 2006/07

Bermuda Friendship Trophy: 4
 1973/74, 1980/81, 1998/99, 1999/00

Bermuda Martonmere Cup: 2
 1972/73, 2002/03

Bermuda Dudley Eve Trophy: 3
 1978/79, 1982/83, 1999/00

Bermuda Super Cup: 3
 1996/97, 1998/99, 2006/07

Bermuda Friendship Shield Cup: 1
 2014/2015

Relegated with fewest points(4) total in the history of the Bermuda Premier Division
 2016/2017

Performance in CONCACAF competitions
CONCACAF Champions Cup – (North Zone): 1 appearance
Best: 1973 – Second Round

Players

Current squad
 For 2015–2016 season

Historical list of coaches

 Keishon Smith (2010)
 Jay Bean(2014–2017)

Jersey sponsor
1975–2000 Lindo's Group Of Companies
2000-2002 Club Funding
2002–TBD BotelhoWood Architects 
2020–2023 TBD

References

External links
Club website
 Club page and roster - Bermuda FA

Football clubs in Bermuda
1958 establishments in Bermuda
Devonshire Parish
Association football clubs established in 1958